Dheimison Benavides Martins (born 1 August 1989), simply known as Dheimison, is a Brazilian professional footballer who plays as a goalkeeper for Brazilian club Maringá Futebol Clube

Honours
Audax
Campeonato Paulista Segunda Divisão: 2008

Maringá
Campeonato Paranaense Série B: 2017

Red Bull Brasil
Campeonato Paulista do Interior: 2019

Red Bull Bragantino
Campeonato Brasileiro Série B: 2019

Portuguesa
Copa Paulista: 2020

References

External links
 

1989 births
Association football goalkeepers
Brazilian footballers
Campeonato Brasileiro Série B players
Campeonato Brasileiro Série D players
Grêmio Osasco Audax Esporte Clube players
Esporte Clube Água Santa players
Maringá Futebol Clube players
Rio Claro Futebol Clube players
Red Bull Brasil players
Red Bull Bragantino players
Associação Portuguesa de Desportos players
Living people
Footballers from São Paulo